Leptus trimaculatus is a species of mite in the Erythraeidae family, first described in 1794 by Pietro Rossi as Trombidium trimaculatus.

References

External links 

 Leptus trimaculatus occurrence data from GBIF

Trombidiformes
Animals described in 1794